Industrial design is a process of design applied to physical products that are to be manufactured by mass production. It is the creative act of determining and defining a product's form and features, which takes place in advance of the manufacture or production of the product. It consists purely of repeated, often automated, replication, while craft-based design is a process or approach in which the form of the product is determined by the product's creator largely concurrent with the act of its production.

All manufactured products are the result of a design process, but the nature of this process can vary. It can be conducted by an individual or a team, and such a team could include people with varied expertise (e.g. designers, engineers, business experts, etc.). It can emphasize intuitive creativity or calculated scientific decision-making, and often emphasizes a mix of both. It can be influenced by factors as varied as materials, production processes, business strategy, and prevailing social, commercial, or aesthetic attitudes. Industrial design, as an applied art, most often focuses on a combination of aesthetics and user-focused considerations, but also often provides solutions for problems of form, function, physical ergonomics, marketing, brand development, sustainability, and sales.

History

Precursors
For several millennia before the onset of industrialization, design, technical expertise, and manufacturing was often done by individual craftsmen, who determined the form of a product at the point of its creation, according to their own manual skill, the requirements of their clients, experience accumulated through their own experimentation, and knowledge passed on to them through training or apprenticeship.

The division of labour that underlies the practice of industrial design did have precedents in the pre-industrial era. The growth of trade in the medieval period led to the emergence of large workshops in cities such as Florence, Venice, Nuremberg, and Bruges, where groups of more specialized craftsmen made objects with common forms through the repetitive duplication of models which defined by their shared training and technique. Competitive pressures in the early 16th century led to the emergence in Italy and Germany of pattern books: collections of engravings illustrating decorative forms and motifs which could be applied to a wide range of products, and whose creation took place in advance of their application. The use of drawing to specify how something was to be constructed later was first developed by architects and shipwrights during the Italian Renaissance.

In the 17th century, the growth of artistic patronage in centralized monarchical states such as France led to large government-operated manufacturing operations epitomized by the Gobelins Manufactory, opened in Paris in 1667 by Louis XIV. Here teams of hundreds of craftsmen, including specialist artists, decorators and engravers, produced sumptuously decorated products ranging from tapestries and furniture to metalwork and coaches, all under the creative supervision of the King's leading artist Charles Le Brun. This pattern of large-scale royal patronage was repeated in the court porcelain factories of the early 18th century, such as the Meissen porcelain workshops established in 1709 by the Grand Duke of Saxony, where patterns from a range of sources, including court goldsmiths, sculptors, and engravers, were used as models for the vessels and figurines for which it became famous. As long as reproduction remained craft-based, however, the form and artistic quality of the product remained in the hands of the individual craftsman, and tended to decline as the scale of production increased.

Birth of industrial design
The emergence of industrial design is specifically linked to the growth of industrialization and mechanization that began with the industrial revolution in Great Britain in the mid 18th century. The rise of industrial manufacture changed the way objects were made, urbanization changed patterns of consumption, the growth of empires broadened tastes and diversified markets, and the emergence of a wider middle class created demand for fashionable styles from a much larger and more heterogeneous population.

The first use of the term "industrial design" is often attributed to the industrial designer Joseph Claude Sinel in 1919 (although he himself denied this in interviews), but the discipline predates 1919 by at least a decade. Christopher Dresser is considered among the first independent industrial designers.  Industrial design's origins lie in the industrialization of consumer products. For instance, the Deutscher Werkbund, founded in 1907 and a precursor to the Bauhaus, was a state-sponsored effort to integrate traditional crafts and industrial mass-production techniques, to put Germany on a competitive footing with Great Britain and the United States.

The earliest published use of the term may have been in The Art-Union, 15 September 1840.

The Practical Draughtsman's Book of Industrial Design by Jacques-Eugène Armengaud was printed in 1853. The subtitle of the (translated) work explains, that it wants to offer a "complete course of mechanical, engineering, and architectural drawing." The study of those types of technical drawing, according to Armengaud, belongs to the field of industrial design. This work paved the way for a big expansion in the field of drawing education in France, the United Kingdom, and the United States.

Robert Lepper helped to establish one of the country's first industrial design degree programs in 1934 at Carnegie Institute of Technology.

Education
Product design and industrial design overlap in the fields of user interface design, information design, and interaction design. Various schools of industrial design specialize in one of these aspects, ranging from pure art colleges and design schools (product styling), to mixed programs of engineering and design, to related disciplines such as exhibit design and interior design, to schools that almost completely subordinated aesthetic design to concerns of usage and ergonomics, the so-called functionalist school. Except for certain functional areas of overlap between industrial design and engineering design, the former is considered an applied art while the latter is an applied science. Educational programs in the U.S. for engineering require accreditation by the Accreditation Board for Engineering and Technology (ABET) in contrast to programs for industrial design which are accredited by the National Association of Schools of Art and Design (NASAD). Of course, engineering education requires heavy training in mathematics and physical sciences, which is not typically required in industrial design education.

Institutions
Most industrial designers complete a design or related program at a vocational school or university. Relevant programs include graphic design, interior design, industrial design, architectural technology, and drafting  Diplomas and degrees in industrial design are offered at vocational schools and universities worldwide. Diplomas and degrees take two  to four years of study. The study results in a Bachelor of Industrial Design (B.I.D.), Bachelor of Science (B.Sc) or Bachelor of Fine Arts (B.F.A.). Afterwards, the bachelor programme can be extended to postgraduate degrees such as Master of Design, Master of Fine Arts and others to a Master of Arts or Master of Science.

Definition

Industrial design studies function and form—and the connection between product, user, and environment. Generally, industrial design professionals work in small scale design, rather than overall design of complex systems such as buildings or ships. Industrial designers don't usually design motors, electrical circuits, or gearing that make machines move, but they may affect technical aspects through usability design and form relationships. Usually, they work with other professionals such as engineers who focus on the mechanical and other functional aspects of the product, assuring functionality and manufacturability, and with marketers to identify and fulfill customer needs and expectations.

Design, itself, is often difficult to describe to non-designers because the meaning accepted by the design community is not made of words. Instead, the definition is created as a result of acquiring a critical framework for the analysis and creation of artifacts. One of the many accepted (but intentionally unspecific) definitions of design originates from Carnegie Mellon's School of Design: "Everyone designs who devises courses of action aimed at changing existing situations into preferred ones." This applies to new artifacts, whose existing state is undefined, and previously created artifacts, whose state stands to be improved.

Industrial design can overlap significantly with engineering design, and in different countries the boundaries of the two concepts can vary, but in general engineering focuses principally on functionality or utility of products, whereas industrial design focuses principally on aesthetic and user-interface aspects of products. In many jurisdictions this distinction is effectively defined by credentials and/or licensure required to engage in the practice of engineering.  "Industrial design" as such does not overlap much with the engineering sub-discipline of industrial engineering, except for the latter's sub-specialty of ergonomics.

At the 29th General Assembly in Gwangju, South Korea, 2015, the Professional Practise Committee unveiled a renewed definition of industrial design as follows:
"Industrial Design is a strategic problem-solving process that drives innovation, builds business success and leads to a better quality of life through innovative products, systems, services and experiences."
An extended version of this definition is as follows:
"Industrial Design is a strategic problem-solving process that drives innovation, builds business success and leads to a better quality of life through innovative products, systems, services and experiences. Industrial Design bridges the gap between what is and what's possible. It is a trans-disciplinary profession that harnesses creativity to resolve problems and co-create solutions with the intent of making a product, system, service, experience or a business, better. At its heart, Industrial Design provides a more optimistic way of looking at the future by reframing problems as opportunities. It links innovation, technology, research, business and customers to provide new value and competitive advantage across economic, social and environmental spheres.
Industrial Designers place the human in the centre of the process. They acquire a deep understanding of user needs through empathy and apply a pragmatic, user centric problem solving process to design products, systems, services and experiences. They are strategic stakeholders in the innovation process and are uniquely positioned to bridge varied professional disciplines and business interests. They value the economic, social and environmental impact of their work and their contribution towards co-creating a better quality of life. "

Design process

Although the process of design may be considered 'creative,' many analytical processes also take place. In fact, many industrial designers often use various design methodologies in their creative process. Some of the processes that are commonly used are user research, sketching, comparative product research, model making, prototyping and testing. These processes are best defined by the industrial designers and/or other team members. Industrial designers often utilize 3D software, computer-aided industrial design and CAD programs to move from concept to production. They may also build a prototype or scaled down sketch models through a 3D printing process or using balsa wood for modeling. They may then use industrial CT scanning to test for interior defects and generate a CAD model. From this the manufacturing process may be modified to improve the product.

Product characteristics specified by industrial designers may include the overall form of the object, the location of details with respect to one another, colors, texture, form, and aspects concerning the use of the product. Additionally, they may specify aspects concerning the production process, choice of materials and the way the product is presented to the consumer at the point of sale. The inclusion of industrial designers in a product development process may lead to added value by improving usability, lowering production costs, and developing more appealing products.

Industrial design may also focus on technical concepts, products, and processes. In addition to aesthetics, usability, and ergonomics, it can also encompass engineering, usefulness, market placement, and other concerns—such as psychology, desire, and the emotional attachment of the user. These values and accompanying aspects that form the basis of industrial design can vary—between different schools of thought, and among practicing designers.

Third Order Design 
An industrial designer effectively balances their design process to include both producers and the market. In Design Issues, Vol 12, No.1, released in 1996, Tony Golsby-Smith wrote the following: “the enlightened industrial designer researches the market and its needs, the producing company and its processes of manufacture, as well as its market aspirations.”. In packaging design, a designer determines the usability and source of action of the artifact – like how the package design would attract a consumer, how the material feels, and access its contents. On the producer side, the designer finds the process to which the package is created and how its contents would fit inside. It places industrial designers to filter out information based on their research and determine the best solution. This form of the design process is what industrial designers commonly use today in their profession. 

Third order also explains two services industrial designers offer. The first is the intervention of the designer in the decision-making process directly – this would be a product that is produced once only. The designer would directly focus on ensuring that the product works for the client. The second is when a designer intervenes indirectly in the process. An example of this would be a product that is produced regularly. Designers are tasked to create a prototype and describe how the client is able to adapt to the design process.

Co-Design 
Recently, industrial designers are finding new methods to approach the design process. Industrial designers tend to work within small teams. This method is called participatory design or co-design. These teams would often consist of different professions based on the project at hand. An industrial designer designing a prosthesis would work with a volunteer patient and with a prosthetist throughout this process. It establishes an environment where the designer and the participants are active members throughout the design process – instead of the designer relying on them only as a primary source of research or reference.

Fourth Order Design 
Third order design only focuses on the intended purpose of the product and its relationship with the producer and the market. On the other hand, fourth order design builds on previous design processes while acknowledging a broader spectrum of thought surrounding a product. These include and are not limited to socio-politics, economics, sustainability, ecology, mental health, etc. which is what Golsby-Smith describes as a field where a solution “exists within a series of connected processes.” each with its own intangible factors. He defines these processes as purpose (culture), integration, and system (community). Using culture as a verb that continuously changes over time, in turn, provides a reason for the integration of a solution. Fourth Order emphasizes that a solution does not exist within a vacuum – questioning its value and reason to why it should exist in the world. Industrial designers do not question this in a philosophical way but more so in its practical implementations. It offers a humanistic approach to the design process as it portrays people as a key feature in the overall design process. 

An example of fourth order design can be found in the Rebuild by Design competition launched by the Obama administration after the devastating damages of Hurricane Sandy. The competition was used to encourage designers to find a viable solution to protect New York from future superstorms. Additionally, they pushed to “overcome existing creative and regulatory barriers by cultivating collaboration between designers, researchers, community members, government officials, and subject matter experts.”. The Big U was chosen for the award and given permission to continue with the project. This solution consists of placing flood gates within neighborhoods and berms across the southern tip of Manhattan – providing protection up to 16 feet above current sea level. The main concern is the fact that the team behind the project only planned for it to guard the city until 2050; Based on the rising projections of storm-force sea level. This will inevitably contribute to displacing of lower to middle-class people in Manhattan. An alternative proposal called Living Breakwaters was offered to build a “necklace” at the south shore of Staten Island where most of the erosion damage was done by Hurricane Sandy. The goal of the project is to tackle the revitalization of marine ecologies and ensure the island is able to host plant, animal, and human life. The breakwaters are planned to be made out of concrete boxes to provide lodging for a variety of marine species. This solution successfully identifies its purpose by embracing climate change as an opportunity for a new ecological future; and the system surrounding the ecological and socio-economic disparity in Manhattan. The Big U is currently underway on advancing the construction of a 2.4-mile system located in Stuyvesant Cove, East River Park – which includes extended flood protections, improved waterfront access, and focused entry points to better connect the community to the park, and upgrade existing sewer systems. Moreover, they are also improving open spaces for 110, 000 New Yorkers and 28, 000 public housing residents. This current state of the Big U portrays consideration for the community affected by its construction. It is evident that they are practicing fourth order design but does not consider the culture of climate change after the year 2050.

Industrial design rights

Industrial design rights are intellectual property rights that make exclusive the visual design of objects that are not purely utilitarian. A design patent would also be considered under this category. An industrial design consists of the creation of a shape, configuration or composition of pattern or color, or combination of pattern and color in three-dimensional form containing aesthetic value. An industrial design can be a two- or three-dimensional pattern used to produce a product, industrial commodity or handicraft. Under the Hague Agreement Concerning the International Deposit of Industrial Designs, a WIPO-administered treaty, a procedure for an international registration exists. An applicant can file for a single international deposit with WIPO or with the national office in a country party to the treaty. The design will then be protected in as many member countries of the treaty as desired.

Examples of industrial design

A number of industrial designers have made such a significant impact on culture and daily life that their work is documented by historians of social science. Alvar Aalto, renowned as an architect, also designed a significant number of household items, such as chairs, stools, lamps, a tea-cart, and vases. Raymond Loewy was a prolific American designer who is responsible for the Royal Dutch Shell corporate logo, the original BP logo (in use until 2000), the PRR S1 steam locomotive, the Studebaker Starlight (including the later bulletnose), as well as Schick electric razors, Electrolux refrigerators, short-wave radios, Le Creuset French ovens, and a complete line of modern furniture, among many other items.

Richard Teague, who spent most of his career with the American Motors Corporation, originated the concept of using interchangeable body panels so as to create a wide array of different vehicles using the same stampings. He was responsible for such unique automotive designs as the Pacer, Gremlin, Matador coupe, Jeep Cherokee, and the complete interior of the Eagle Premier.

Milwaukee's Brooks Stevens was best known for his Milwaukee Road Skytop Lounge car and Oscar Mayer Wienermobile designs, among others.

Viktor Schreckengost designed bicycles manufactured by Murray bicycles for Murray and Sears, Roebuck and Company. With engineer Ray Spiller, he designed the first truck with a cab-over-engine configuration, a design in use to this day. Schreckengost also founded The Cleveland Institute of Art's school of industrial design.

Oskar Barnack was a German optical engineer, precision mechanic, industrial designer, and the father of 35mm photography. He developed the Leica, which became the hallmark for photography for 50 years, and remains a high-water mark for mechanical and optical design. 

Charles and Ray Eames were most famous for their pioneering furniture designs, such as the Eames Lounge Chair Wood and Eames Lounge Chair. Other influential designers included Henry Dreyfuss, Eliot Noyes, John Vassos, and Russel Wright.

Dieter Rams is a German industrial designer closely associated with the consumer products company Braun and the Functionalist school of industrial design.

German industrial designer Luigi Colani, who designed cars for automobile manufacturers including Fiat, Alfa Romeo, Lancia, Volkswagen, and BMW, was also known to the general public for his unconventional approach to industrial design. He had expanded in numerous areas ranging from mundane household items, instruments and furniture to trucks, uniforms and entire rooms. A grand piano created by Colani, the Pegasus, is manufactured and sold by the Schimmel piano company.

Many of Apple's recent products were designed by Sir Jonathan Ive.

See also

 Automotive design
 Designer
 Creative engineering
 Engineering design process
 Engineering design
 Geometric drawing
 Product development
 Product design
 Rapid prototyping
 Form follows function
 TU Delft Faculty of Industrial Design Engineering
 Industrial Designers Society of America
 Hardware Interface Design
 Sustainable design
 Sensory design
 Chief experience officer (CXO)
 Communication design
 Core77
 Emotional Design by Donald Norman
 Environmental design
 Experience design
 Hague system
 Interaction design
 Transgenerational design
 Virtual Product Development
 WikID
 RKS Design

Notes

References

Sources
 Barnwell, Maurice. Design, Creativity and Culture, Black Dog, 2011, 
 Barnwell, Maurice. Design Evolution: Big Bang to Big Data,Toronto, 2014. 
 
 Forty, Adrian. Objects of Desire: Design and Society Since 1750. Thames Hudson, May 1992. 
 
 
 Mayall, WH, Industrial Design for Engineers, London: Iliffe Books, 1967, 
 Mayall, WH, Machines and Perception in Industrial Design, London: Studio Vista, 1968, 
 Meikle, Jeffrey. Twentieth Century Limited: Industrial Design engineering in America, 1925 - 1939,  Philadelphia: Temple University Press, 1979

External links

  Doodles, Drafts and Designs: Industrial Drawings from the Smithsonian (2004) Smithsonian Institution Libraries

 
Product management
Design history
Design for X